Danish language exonyms for non-Danish speaking locations exist, primarily in Europe, but many of these are no longer commonly used, with a few notable exceptions. Rom (Rome), Lissabon (Lisboa (Lisbon)), Sankt Petersborg (St Petersburg) and Prag (Prague) are still compulsory, while e.g. Venedig is more common than Venezia (Venice). In the decades following World War II, there has been a strong tendency towards replacing Danish exonyms with the native equivalent used in the foreign country itself. Possibly this is because many of these Danish forms (e.g. for names in Belgium, Italy and Eastern Europe) were imported from German.

Until recently, it was official Danish policy to use Danish exonyms on road signs if Danish forms were commonly used and known. This has, however, been changed following a change in international agreements. Currently, one can still see Danish road signs pointing towards Flensborg and Hamborg across the border, however Nibøl has been replaced by Niebüll. Signs leading to the Sound Bridge usually have Malmø with Danish spelling.

In Southern Schleswig, the region south of the Danish-German border, a set of original (or, in some cases, reconstructed) Danish placenames exists alongside the German names, just as most North Slesvig placenames have German counterparts dating from the period under Prussian rule (1864–1920). The Danish placenames in Southern Schleswig are used by the local Danish minority and their media, while some in Denmark may avoid using them for political reasons. The use of German placenames in North Slesvig is similarly preferred by the local German minority (when speaking and writing German), but traditionally shunned by many Danes in the region. From 2008, municipalities in Schleswig-Holstein have been allowed bilingual town signs with the official minority languages: Danish, North Frisian and Low German. So far, the city of Flensburg has been the only municipality to introduce bilingual German/Danish signs.

Danish placenames dating from the colonial era exist for almost all major settlements in Greenland. Some of the places in question were founded as settlements under a Danish name, while others were originally Greenlandic toponyms. Very frequently, the Danish and Greenlandic names have different etymologies; while the former are often named after settlers or explorers, the latter usually describe geographical features. In 1983, a Danish law officially transferred the naming authority to the Greenlandic Home Rule. During the years before and after that, a complete set of Greenlandic placenames have ousted the former traditional Danish names. Danish names in Greenland are now mostly known or used by older-generation Danish-speakers or by Danes living in Greenland. Until recently, Greenland was still – both officially and de facto –  bilingual, but Greenlandic has assumed the status of sole official language in Greenland, following the island's recent change from hjemmestyre (home rule) to selvstyre (autonomy).

Faroese placenames were Danicised in an era when no Faroese orthography existed, but the Danish names were replaced by Faroese ones during the first half of the 20th century (somewhat later on maps). Today only Thorshavn is commonly used (alongside the Faroese Tórshavn and the hybrid Torshavn).

An example of radical use of Danish exonyms can be found in many street names on the island of Amager, a part of Copenhagen. The city expanded greatly during the first half of the 20th century. Dozens of streets in the district were named after European cities or regions. It was deemed suitable for practical reasons that street names were adapted to Danish spelling rules, resulting in names such as Nyrnborggade and Lyneborggade.

Albania

Belgium

Czechia

Denmark

Faroe Islands 
Modern Danish generally uses the original Faroese names. Torshavn / Thorshavn is still in active use. Fuglefjord, Klaksvig and Tværå are also occasionally seen. Also seen are variants where ð and á are replaced by d and å, and/ or accents omitted for á, í, ó, ú, ý. English generally has no established exonyms for any Faroese placenames.

Greenland 
English lacks exonyms for any Greenlandic placename.

Estonia

Finland

In general Swedish names are used for more well-known places. Less well-known places (to Danes, at any rate) will tend to retain their Finnish-language names (Lappeenranta instead of Villmanstrand, Iisalmi instead of Idensalmi).

Germany
Danish has a very large number of exonyms for locations in modern Germany. Almost all of these are originally Danish names in the region of Southern Schleswig, a Danish territory until 1864 and still home to a Danish minority. Some of these exonyms are not commonly known in Denmark proper, but remain in use among the Danish minority in Germany and its newspaper, Flensborg Avis, and among the few remaining speakers of the South Jutlandic dialect south of the border. The names are also traditionally used by Danish historians, although some modern academics dismiss the usage of Danish exonyms outside present Denmark, at least in writing. Larger and well-known locations are more likely to be referred to by means of a Danish exonym, e.g. Flensborg and Slesvig [By], but also Hamborg which is not in the Schleswig region. The historical Dannevirke fortification and Hedeby are always referred to by its Danish name.

While almost all placenames in Schleswig north of the medieval language border (a line between Husum and Eckernförde, excluding the North Frisian area) are of genuine Danish (North Germanic) origin, there have also been limited attempts to construct Danish alternatives for placenames in the extreme southern part of Schleswig, which is originally German (Low Saxon) speaking (similar to the genuine Danish place names in North Slesvig, that have German constructed counterparts dating from the period under Prussian rule 1864–1920). The latter names, as well as Danicised placenames in the Frisian area, are less commonly used. Before 1864, when the Danish monarchy comprised the Duchy of Holstein, there was also sporadic usage of Danicised spellings of placenames in Holstein, such as Plø(e)n (Plön) and Vandsbæk (Wandsbek). The latter name is still seen in the Danish phrase "ad Vandsbæk til" (see: Wandsbek (quarter)#History).

Greece

India

Italy

Lithuania

Luxembourg

Netherlands

Norway
From the 16th until the late 19th century, Danish was officially used, replacing the Norwegian written language, but then spelling reforms gradually replaced it with Dano-Norwegian and the two present-day forms of Norwegian: Bokmål and Nynorsk. Until then, a lot of Norwegian placenames were written in Danish. Almost all of them are now obsolete and not even used in Danish historical contexts. They may, however, still be used in the names of Norwegian newspapers, companies, institutions and associations. In present-day Norway, they will often be perceived more as "ancient" names than as Danish ones.

Poland

Portugal

Romania

Russia

South Africa

Spain

Sweden

Some of these forms are archaic, based on names used in the 17th century prior to the surrender of the Eastern Danish lands Skåne, Halland and Blekinge to Sweden. Modern usage is primarily confined to history books and Scanian activists. These forms were also used in a number of texts in the first decades of the 20th century. The only example consistently used in modern Danish is Hven, maybe because this form hinders confusion with the Danish word ven ("friend"). Since the opening of the Øresund Bridge, the form Malmø has again gained widespread use above Malmö. Engelholm and Øland (Öland) are occasionally seen. Knærød and Elfsborg are relatively common in historical works, due to their connection to historical events; the 1613 Peace of Knäred (Freden i Knærød) and the Ransom of Älvsborg (Elfsborgs løsen).  The forms Gønge and Gønge Herred are also quite common given their connection to Svend Poulsen Gønge, known from the historical novel and TV series, Gøngehøvdingen.

Some forms are just replacement of ä/ö with æ/ø based on computer keyboards used by the press. This can be used for further places, any with ä and ö, .e.g. Växjö or Östersund, but are often considered misspellings. This is in contrast to Swedish exonyms for places in Denmark where æ and ø are usually converted by the press.

United States

The U.S. Virgin Islands were formerly a colony of Denmark, often referred to simply as Sankt Thomas, Sankt Jan og Sankt Croix.

See also

List of European exonyms

References

Danish language
Lists of exonyms